The Fiat G.12 was an Italian transport aircraft of World War II.

Design and development
The G.12 was an all-metal low-wing cantilever personnel transport aircraft. It had three radial engines, one mounted on the nose and the other two in wing-mounted nacelles. The engines drove three-blade feathering metal propellers. The mainwheels of its landing gear retracted into the nacelles; the tailwheel was fixed. The flight deck and cabin were fully enclosed. Access was via a portside access door aft of the wing.

The G.12 was designed as a civil aircraft, but served mainly in military roles during the war. Only a limited number were built, some as late as 1944, after the Italian armistice. The G.12 inspired the postwar G.212 "Flying Classroom", the last Italian three-engine transporter. It had a crew of four.

Variants
G.12C 
14-passenger transport aircraft, powered by three 574 kW (770 hp) Fiat A.74 R.C.42 radial engines.
G.12 Gondar 
Long-range cargo transport aircraft. 
G.12GA
Long-range transport aircraft, fitted with extra fuel tanks. Three built.
G.12RT
Special long-range version, built to fly between Rome and Tokyo. One built.
G.12RTbis
One built.
G.12T
Troop and cargo transport aircraft.
G.12CA
18-passenger commercial airliner, powered by three Alfa Romeo 128 radial engines.
G.12L
22-passenger commercial airliner. 
G.12LA
22-passenger commercial airliner, powered by three Alfa Romeo 128 radial engines.
G.12LB
22-passenger commercial airliner, powered by three 604 kW (810 hp) Bristol Pegasus 48 radial engines.
G.12LP
22-passenger commercial airliner, powered by three 793 kW (1,065 hp) Pratt & Whitney R-1830-S1C3-G Twin Wasp radial engines.

Operators

Military operators
 
 Luftwaffe
 
 Royal Hungarian Air Force operated 12 aircraft
 
 Regia Aeronautica

Italian Air Force  operated some aircraft until 1956

Civil operators

Avio Linee Italiane

Ali Flotti Riunite
Alitalia-Linee Aeree Italiane

Specifications

See also

References

Bibliography
 Angelucci, Enzo The World Encyclopedia of Military Aircraft. London:Jane's Publishing, 1981. .
 Angelucci, Enzo The World Encyclopedia of Military Aircraft, London, 1987.

 Stroud, John. European Transport Aircraft since 1910. London: Putnam, 1966.
 Stroud, John. "Post War Propliners : Fiat G.12 and G.212". Aeroplane Monthly. Volume 23 No. 1, January 1994. London: IPC. Page 64-68.

External links

picture of Fiat G.12

G.012
1940s Italian airliners
Trimotors
World War II Italian transport aircraft
Low-wing aircraft
Aircraft first flown in 1940